The T-Power is a skyscraper office building located in Taichung's 7th Redevelopment Zone, Xitun District, Taichung, Taiwan. The building was completed in 2018.

See also 
 List of tallest buildings in Taiwan
 List of tallest buildings in Taichung
 Taichung's 7th Redevelopment Zone

References

External links
 

2018 establishments in Taiwan
Skyscraper office buildings in Taichung
Office buildings completed in 2018
Taichung's 7th Redevelopment Zone